Kostyantyn Petrovych Morozov (born 3 June 1944) is a Soviet-Ukrainian former military officer who served as the first Minister of Defence of Ukraine following its 1991 declaration of independence. Morozov also briefly served as Ukraine's ambassador to Iran in 2005 and as ambassador to NATO from 2005 to 2007. In his latter office, Morozov was a key figure in establishing Ukraine's policy of seeking to join NATO.

Biography
Kostyantyn Morozov was born in a village of Lozova Pavlivka (today part of Brianka, in Luhansk Oblast) on 3 June 1944. His father, Petro Stepanovych Morozov, was an ethnically-Russian mine electrician, and his mother was an ethnically-Ukrainian school teacher. Petro Stepanovych died on the job when Kostyantyn was around 10 years old.

Morozov graduated from the Hrytsevych Higher Military Aviation College for the Air Force pilots in Kharkiv in 1967, after which he served in the Soviet Air Forces' Northern Group. In 1975, Morozov graduated the Gagarin Military-Air Academy. Afterwards, Morozov held a number of commanding position across the Soviet Union. From 1984 to 1986, he studied at and graduated from the Voroshilov Military Academy of General Staff of the Soviet Armed Forces. During that period, Morozov also served as a chief of staff of an air army in Smolensk and, in 1988, was transferred to the same position of a different air army stationed in Kyiv. In 1990, Morozov was appointed the commander of that army.

Soon after the 1991 Soviet coup d'état attempt, Morozov was appointed by the Verkhovna Rada as the first Minister of Defence of independent Ukraine on 3 September 1991. On 1 October 1991 he was dismissed from the commander of Kyiv Military District air army by President of the Soviet Union and the Ministry of Defence of the Soviet Union. On 6 December 1991 Morozov pledged his allegiance to the people of Ukraine. Due to his personal position in regard to the Black Sea Fleet, he voluntarily resigned from his position on 4 October 1993.

After his dismissal from the ministry and the Armed Forces of Ukraine, Morozov participated in various public activities: a Coordination council member of the Ukrainian intelligentsia Congress, leader of electoral public organization "Democratic Association Ukraine", coordinator of democratic parties of Ukraine, a member of the Ukrainian-American consulting committee in policy development. In 1994-95 he studied English, foundations of state administration and international security policy at the John F. Kennedy School of Government (Harvard University).

From 2000 to 2001, Morozov was the Ambassador of Ukraine to Iran. In 2003. Morozov graduated from the Open International University of Human Development "Ukraine". From 2005 to 2007 he headed the Ukraine mission to NATO, but resigned following a change in government policy towards Ukrainian integration into NATO.

See also
 Ihor Sahach
 Ihor Dolhov

Notes

Bibliography
  Morozov, K. ''Above and beyond: From Soviet general to Ukrainian state builder. Introd. by Sherman W. Garnett. Cambridge: Harvard University Publishing, 2000. 295. XXII.

External links
  Army of Ukraine
  Cold War for Crimea. How dealt the fleet. Ukrayinska Pravda.
  Interview. Vysokyi Zamok.

1944 births
Living people
People from Brianka
Colonel Generals of Ukraine
Defence ministers of Ukraine
Recipients of the Order "For Service to the Homeland in the Armed Forces of the USSR", 2nd class
Ambassadors of Ukraine to Iran
Heads of mission of Ukraine to NATO
Military Academy of the General Staff of the Armed Forces of the Soviet Union alumni